Johann Christoph Friedrich Bach (21 June 1732 – 26 January 1795) was a German composer and harpsichordist, the fifth son of Johann Sebastian Bach, sometimes referred to as the "Bückeburg Bach".

Born in Leipzig in the Electorate of Saxony, he was taught music by his father, and also tutored by his distant cousin . He studied at the St. Thomas School, and some believe he studied law at the university there, but there is no record of this. In 1750, William, Count of Schaumburg-Lippe appointed Johann Christoph harpsichordist at Bückeburg, and in 1759, he became concertmaster. While there, Bach collaborated with Johann Gottfried Herder, who provided the texts for six vocal works; the music survives for only four of these.

Bach wrote keyboard sonatas, symphonies, oratorios, liturgical choir pieces and motets, operas and songs. Because of Count Wilhelm's predilection for Italian music, Bach had to adapt his style accordingly, but he retained stylistic traits of the music of his father and of his brother, C. P. E. Bach.

He married the singer Lucia Elisabeth Münchhausen (1728–1803) in 1755 and the Count stood as godfather to his son Wilhelm Friedrich Ernst Bach. J.C.F. educated his son in music as his own father had, and Wilhelm Friedrich Ernst went on to become music director to Frederick William II of Prussia.

In April 1778 he and Wilhelm travelled to England to visit Johann Christian Bach. J. C. F. Bach died 1795 in Bückeburg, aged 62.

Assessment
The 1911 Encyclopædia Britannica says of him "He was an industrious composer, ... whose work reflects no discredit on the family name." He was an outstanding virtuoso of the keyboard, with a reasonably wide repertory of surviving works, including twenty symphonies, the later ones influenced by Haydn and Mozart; hardly a genre of vocal music was neglected by him.

A significant portion of J. C. F. Bach's output was lost in the WWII destruction of the Staatliches Institut für Musikforschung in Berlin, where the scores had been on deposit since 1917. Musicologists Hansdieter Wohlfahrth, who catalogued his works, and Ulrich Leisinger consider Bach a transitional figure in the mold of his half-brother C. P. E., his brother Johann Christian, the Grauns (Carl and Johann), and Georg Philipp Telemann, with some works in the style of the high Baroque, some in a galant idiom, and still others which combine elements of the two, along with traits of the nascent classical style.

Works
"BR-JCFB" denotes "Bach-Repertorium Johann Christoph Friedrich Bach". "Wf" denotes "wohlfahrt verzeichnis". Bach Digital Work (BDW) pages contain information about individual compositions.

Keyboard works
Two Sonatas from "Musikalisches Vielerley" collection of works made by CPE Bach - not after 1770.
BR-JCFB A 1 \ Keyboard Sonata in F major (Wf XI/1)
BR-JCFB A 2 \ Keyboard Sonata in C major (Wf XI/2)
"Six easy Sonatas for Clavier or Pianoforte" - composed before December 26, 1783.
BR-JCFB A 3 \ No. 1 - Keyboard Sonata in C major (Wf XI/3.1)
BR-JCFB A 4 \ No. 2 - Keyboard Sonata in F major (Wf XI/3.2)
BR-JCFB A 5 \ No. 3 - Keyboard Sonata in E major (Wf XI/3.3)
BR-JCFB A 6 \ No. 4 - Keyboard Sonata in D major (Wf XI/3.4)
BR-JCFB A 7 \ No. 5 - Keyboard Sonata in A major (Wf XI/3.5)
BR A 8 \ Keyboard Sonata in E-flat major (Wf XI/3.6)
Three Sonatas and Sonatina from "Musikalische Nebenstunden" Collection of works made by JCF Bach - Not after 1787/88
BR-JCFB A 9 \ Keyboard Sonata in C major (Wf XI/4)
BR-JCFB A 10 \ Keyboard Sonata in G major (Wf XI/5)
BR-JCFB A 11 \ Keyboard Sonata in F major (Wf XI/6)
BR-JCFB A 12 \ Keyboard Sonatina in A minor (Wf XI/7)
"Three easy Sonatas for Clavier of Pianoforte" - composed before October 1788, published in 1789 
BR-JCFB A 13 \ No. 1 - Keyboard Sonata in D major (Wf XI/8.1)
BR-JCFB A 14 \ No. 2 - Keyboard Sonata in A major (Wf XI/8.2)
BR-JCFB A 15 \ No. 3 - Keyboard Sonata in E major (Wf XI/8.3)
Six easy Sonatas - composed around 1785 - perhaps composed for Christoph Ernst Abraham Albrecht von Boineburg, at that time the judiciary in Rinteln.
BR-JCFB A 16 \ No. 1 - Keyboard Sonata in D major
BR-JCFB A 17 \ No. 2 - Keyboard Sonata in A major
BR-JCFB A 18 \ No. 3 - Keyboard Sonata in F major (Wf XI/9)
BR-JCFB A 19 \ No. 4 - Keyboard Sonata in B-flat major
BR-JCFB A 20 \ No. 5 - Keyboard Sonata in G major
BR-JCFB A 21 \ No. 6 - Keyboard Sonata in E-flat major
Six Sonatas - composed around 1785 - probably like A 16 - 21 for C.E.A.A von Boineburg.
BR-JCFB A 22 - 25 \ 4 Keyboard Sonatas (lost)
BR-JCFB A 26 \ No. 5 - Keyboard Sonata in E-flat major
BR-JCFB A 27 \ No. 6 - Keyboard Sonata in F major
Seven Sonatas - Composed before around and not after March 1789, only one Sonata survived.
BR-JCFB A 28–30, A 32-34 \ 6 Keyboard Sonatas (lost)
BR-JCFB A 31 \ Keyboard Sonata in D major
BR-JCFB A 35 - 37 \ 3 Keyboard Sonatas (lost)
BR-JCFB A 38 - 39 \ 2 Keyboard Sonatas (lost)
BR-JCFB A 40 \ keyboard Sonata for 4 hands in A major (Wf XIII/1) - around 1786
BR-JCFB A 41 \ keyboard Sonata for 4 hands in C major (Wf XIII/2) - perhaps around 1791
BR-JCFB A 42 - 43 \ 2 Sonatas for 2 keyboards (lost)
BR-JCFB A 44 \ Variations in A major (Wf XII/1) (lost)
BR-JCFB A 45 \ Allegretto in G major with 18 Variations on "Ah vous dirais-je Maman" (Wf XII/2) - Composed around 1785/90 - originally comprised only 13 variations and was later expanded by 5 variations.
Five Pieces from "Musikalisches Vielerley" - not after 1770
BR-JCFB A 46 \ Minuet for dance and Trio in D major (Wf XII/3)
BR-JCFB A 47 \ Alla polacca in G major (Wf XII/7)
BR-JCFB A 48 \ Minuet and Trio in F major (Wf XII/4)
BR-JCFB A 49 \ Two minuets for dance in D major (Wf XII/5)
BR-JCFB A 50 \ Alla polacca in F major (Wf XII/6)
Seventy pieces from "Musikalische Nebenstunden" - The keyboard pieces belong to different genre traditions and are likely to come from different creative periods. (Wf XII/13)
BR-JCFB A 51 \ Allegro in C major
BR-JCFB A 52 \ Minuet in C major (BWV deest)
BR-JCFB A 53 \ Andante in G major 
BR-JCFB A 54 \ March in G major 
BR-JCFB A 55 \ Allegretto in F major 
BR-JCFB A 56 \ Minuet alternating between F major and B-flat major
BR-JCFB A 57 \ Polonaise in F major 
BR-JCFB A 58 \ Allegretto in D major 
BR-JCFB A 59 \ March in D major 
BR-JCFB A 60 \ Schwäbisch (Swabian) in D major (kind of folk dance)
BR-JCFB A 61 \ Minuet in D major and Trio in G major
BR-JCFB A 62 \ Angloise in G major 
BR-JCFB A 63 \ Villanella in C major 
BR-JCFB A 64 \ Scherzo in C major 
BR-JCFB A 65 \ Allegro moderato in G major 
BR-JCFB A 66 \ Minuet in G major and Trio in C major 
BR-JCFB A 67 \ Polonaise in G major
BR-JCFB A 68 \ March in G major
BR-JCFB A 69 \ Angloise and trio in G major
BR-JCFB A 70 \ Allegro F major
BR-JCFB A 71 \ Schwäbisch F major
BR-JCFB A 72 \ Minuet in F major and Trio in B-flat major
BR-JCFB A 73 \ Allegro in D minor
BR-JCFB A 74 \ Angloise in F major
BR-JCFB A 75 \ Minuet in C major
BR-JCFB A 76 \ March in G major
BR-JCFB A 77 \ March in D major and Trio in G major
BR-JCFB A 78 \ Allegro in G major
BR-JCFB A 79 \ Minuet and Trio in G major
BR-JCFB A 80 \ Allegro in B-flat major
BR-JCFB A 81 \ Villanella in D major
BR-JCFB A 82 \ Angloise in D major and Trio in G major
BR-JCFB A 83 \ March in G major
BR-JCFB A 84 \ Villanella in B-flat major
BR-JCFB A 85 \ Angloise in B-flat major
BR-JCFB A 86 \ Presto in G minor
BR-JCFB A 87 \ Allegro in E-flat major
BR-JCFB A 88 \ Adagio in C minor
BR-JCFB A 89 \ March in E-flat major
BR-JCFB A 90 \ Minuet in E-flat major and Trio in B-flat major
BR-JCFB A 91 \ Polonaise in E-flat major
BR-JCFB A 92 \ Angloise in E-flat major and Trio in B-flat major
BR-JCFB A 93 \ March in E-flat major
BR-JCFB A 94 \ Minuet alternating between E-flat major and C minor
BR-JCFB A 95 \ Allegro in E minor
BR-JCFB A 96 \ Minuet alternating between A major and E major
BR-JCFB A 97 \ Angloise in D major
BR-JCFB A 98 \ Angloise in D major
BR-JCFB A 99 \ Minuet in D major and Trio in A major
BR-JCFB A 100 \ Musette in G major
BR-JCFB A 101 \ Solfeggio in G major
BR-JCFB A 102 \ Angloise in D major
BR-JCFB A 103 \ Minuet in G major and Trio in D major
BR-JCFB A 104 \ Polonaise in D major
BR-JCFB A 105 \ March in D major
BR-JCFB A 106 \ Andante in E major
BR-JCFB A 107 \ Angloise in A major
BR-JCFB A 108 \ Solfeggio in D major
BR-JCFB A 109 \ Angloise in G major
BR-JCFB A 110 \ March in B-flat major
BR-JCFB A 111 \ Schwäbisch in F major
BR-JCFB A 112 \ Angloise in B-flat major
BR-JCFB A 113 \ Schwäbisch in D major
BR-JCFB A 114 \ Polonaise in E-flat major
BR-JCFB A 115 \ Minuet in E-flat major and Trio in B-flat major
BR-JCFB A 116 \ Schwäbisch in C major
BR-JCFB A 117 \ Minuet and Trio in C major
BR-JCFB A 118 \ Angloise in F major
BR-JCFB A 119 \ Alla Polacca in C major
BR-JCFB A 120 \ Minuet in F major and Trio in F minor
Five Pieces - composed around 1745/49, at least before taking up service in Bückeburg.
BR-JCFB A 121 \ Polonaise in G major (Wf XII/8)
BR-JCFB A 122 \ Minuet in F major (Wf XII/9)
BR-JCFB A 123 \ Polonaise in F major (Wf XII/10)
BR-JCFB A 124 \ Minuet in G major (Wf XII/11)
BR-JCFB A 125 \ Minuet in A major (Wf XII/12)
BR-JCFB A Inc1 \ Partia (Allegro) in C major - around 1745 (BWV deest)
Six fugues - published under Telemann name - not after 1758
BR-JCFB A Inc2 \ Fugue for keyboard in G minor (lost) - based on G minor fugue from WTC I by JS Bach
BR-JCFB A Inc3 \ Fugue for keyboard in E minor (lost)
BR-JCFB A Inc4 \ Fugue for keyboard in C major (lost)
BR-JCFB A Inc5 \ Fugue for keyboard in F major (TWV 30:27) - based on fugue - Wq 119.3 by CPEB
BR-JCFB A Inc6 \ Fugue for keyboard in D major (lost)
BR-JCFB A Inc7 \ Fugue for keyboard in C major (lost)
BR-JCFB A Inc8 \ Galanterie-Stücke for keyboard

Chamber music
The "Sonatas" denotes the Trio Sonata form.
BR-JCFB B 1 \ Cello Sola in A major (Wf X/3)(1770)
BR-JCFB B 2 \ Cello Solo in G major (Wf X/1)
BR-JCFB B 3a \ Trio for traverso flute, violin & bc in A major (Wf VII/1)
BR-JCFB B 3b \ Trio for traverso flute and keyboard in A major (Wf VII/1)
BR-JCFB B 4 \ Trio for flute, viola & bc in E minor
BR-JCFB B 5 - 10 \ Six Trios for two Flutes and Basso continuo - composed by May 1, 1770 - lost.
Two trios for two Violins and Basso Continuo - Composed before December 23, 1768.
BR-JCFB B 11 \ Trio for 2 violins & b.c. in A major (Wf VII/2)
BR-JCFB B 12 \ Trio for 2 violins & b.c. in F major (Wf VII/3)
BR-JCFB B 13 \ Trio for 2 violins & b.c. (lost)
BR-JCFB B 14 \ Trio for keyboard and violin/flute in E-flat major (Wf VIII/2)
Six Sonatas for Keyboard and flute (violin) - one of the most widely performed work by composer - published 1777
BR-JCFB B 15 \ Flute Sonata No. 1 in D minor (Wf VIII/3.1)
BR-JCFB B 16 \ Flute Sonata No. 2 in D major (Wf VIII/3.2) - two versions 16a and 16b.
BR-JCFB B 17 \ Flute Sonata No. 3 in C major (Wf VIII/3.3)
BR-JCFB B 18 \ Flute Sonata No. 4 in C major (Wf VIII/3.4) - two versions 18a and 18b.
BR-JCFB B 19 \ Flute Sonata No. 5 in A major (Wf VIII/3.5)
BR-JCFB B 20 \ Flute Sonata No. 6 in C major (Wf VIII/3.6)
versions 16b and 18b were versions made after the published collection, meaning that 16a and 18a are those found in the collection
Two Sonatas for keyboard and violin from Musikalische Nebenstunden
BR-JCFB B 21 \ Sonata in G major (Wf IX/2)
BR-JCFB B 22 \ Sonata in D major (Wf IX/3)
BR-JCFB B 23 - 24 \ 2 Flute Sonatas (lost)
Three Sonatas for keyboard and flute (violin) - composed around 1770/80
BR-JCFB B 25 \ Sonata in F major (Wf VIII/1)
BR-JCFB B 26 \ Violin Sonata in F major (incomplete)
BR-JCFB B 27 \ Violin Sonata in D major (incomplete)
BR-JCFB B 28 \ Sonata for Keyboard and Violin in G major (Wf IX/1) (lost)
BR-JCFB B 29a \ Sonata for keyboard and flute/violin in D major (Wf VII/4)
BR-JCFB B 29b \ Sonata for Harpsichord concertato and flute/violin and Violoncello in D major (Wf VII/4) - later version
Six Sonatas with keyboard - composed around 1780 not before 1777 - for Keyboard, Flute, Violin and Viola
BR-JCFB B 30 \ Sonata No. 1 (lost)
BR-JCFB B 31 \ Sonata No. 2 in G major (Wf VII/5)
BR-JCFB B 32 \ Sonata No. 3 in A major (Wf VII/6)
BR-JCFB B 33 \ Sonata  No. 4 (lost)
BR-JCFB B 34 \ Sonata  No. 5 in C major (Wf VII/7)
BR-JCFB B 35 \ Sonata  No. 6 (lost)
BR-JCFB B 36 \ Sonata in A major (Keyboard, Cello) (Wf X/4) (lost)
Six Quartet for Flute, Violin, Viola and Basso Continuo - composed around 1768/69 and not before 1766
BR-JCFB B 37 \ Quartet No. 1 in D major (Wf VI/1)
BR-JCFB B 38 \ Quartet No. 2 in G major (Wf VI/2)
BR-JCFB B 39 \ Quartet No. 3 in C major (Wf VI/3)
BR-JCFB B 40 \ Quartet No. 4 in D major (Wf VI/4)
BR-JCFB B 41 \ Quartet No. 5 in F major (Wf VI/5)
BR-JCFB B 42 \ Quartet No. 6 in B-flat major (Wf VI/6)
Six Quartet for 2 Violins, viola and Basso Continuo - composed in England around 1778
BR-JCFB B 43 \ String Quartet No. 1 in E-flat major
BR-JCFB B 44 \ String Quartet No. 2 in B-flat major
BR-JCFB B 45 \ String Quartet No. 3 in A major
BR-JCFB B 46 \ String Quartet No. 4 in D major
BR-JCFB B 47 \ String Quartet No. 5 in G major
BR-JCFB B 48 \ String Quartet No. 6 in F major
BR-JCFB B 49 \ (Wind) Septet for Oboe, 2 Clarinets, 2 Bassoons and 2 Horns in E-flat major (Wf IV/1) (lost)
BR-JCFB B 50 - 53 \ 4 Marches for wind band (lost)
BR-JCFB B Inc1 \ Trio Sonata for 2 violins & b.c. in B-flat major (Wf XX/3)
BR-JCFB B Inc2 \ Trio Sonata for 2 flutes & b.c. in C major (lost)
BR-JCFB B Inc3 \ Cello Sonata in D major (Wf X/2) (lost)
BR-JCFB B Inc4 \ Violin Sonata (lost)

Orchestral works
Seven Symphonies - composed before December 23, 1768
BR-JCFB C 1 \ Symphony in D major (Wf I/5) (lost)
BR-JCFB C 1b \ Symphony in D major - keyboard reduction (Wf I/5)
BR-JCFB C 2 - 3 \ 2 Symphonies (lost)
BR-JCFB C 4 \ Symphony in D minor (Wf I/3)
BR-JCFB C 5 \ Symphony in F major (Wf I/1)
BR-JCFB C 6 \ Symphony in B-flat major (Wf I/2)
BR-JCFB C 7 \ Symphony in E major (Wf I/4)
Three Symphonies - composed by 1770
BR-JCFB C 8 - 9 \ 2 Symphonies(lost)
BR-JCFB C 10 \ Symphony in C major (Wf I/6)
Three Symphonies à 6- composed until 1770
BR-JCFB C 11 \ Symphony in D major (Wf I/8) (lost)
BR-JCFB C 12 \ Symphony in G major (Wf I/7) (lost)
BR-JCFB C 13 \ Symphony in D major (Wf I/9) (lost)
BR-JCFB C 14 \ Symphony in E-flat major (Wf I/10)
BR-JCFB C 15 - 17 \ 3 Symphonies (lost)
Six Symphonies à 8 or à 10 - composed by 1792
BR-JCFB C 18 \ Symphony (lost)
BR-JCFB C 19 \ Symphony no. 2 in D major (Wf I/11) (lost)
BR-JCFB C 20 \ Symphony no. 3 in F major (Wf I/12) (lost)
BR-JCFB C 21 \ Symphony no. 4 in D major (Wf I/13) (lost)
BR-JCFB C 22 \ Symphony no. 5 in C major (Wf I/14) (lost)
BR-JCFB C 23 \ Symphony no. 6 in G major (Wf I/15) 
BR-JCFB C 24 \ Symphony in E-flat major (Wf I/18) (lost)
BR-JCFB C 25 \ Symphony in E-flat major (Wf I/19) (lost)
BR-JCFB C 26 \ "Grand Symphony" in D major (Wf I/16) (lost)
BR-JCFB C 27 \ Symphony in C major (Wf I/17) (lost)
BR-JCFB C 28 \ Symphony in B-flat major (Wf I/20) - composed until August 1794
BR-JCFB C 29 \ Keyboard Concerto no. 1 in E-flat major (incorrectly attributed to JCB (Warb YC 90)
BR-JCFB C 30a \ Keyboard Concerto no. 2(Orchestral version) in A major - until mid-May 1768 (Incorrectly attributed to CPE Bach and JC Bach) H383 and H490, Warb YC 91
BR-JCFB C 30b \ Keyboard Concerto no 2. (Keyboard solo) in A major - until mid-May 1768 (Incorrectly attributed to CPE Bach and JC Bach) H383,H384
Six Keyboard Concerto - Composed in England around 1778  or immediately after his return.
BR-JCFB C 31 \ Keyboard Concerto "London No. 1" in G major
BR-JCFB C 32 \ Keyboard Concerto "London No. 2" in F major
BR-JCFB C 33 \ Keyboard Concerto "London No. 3" in D major
BR-JCFB C 34 \ Keyboard Concerto "London No. 4" in E-flat major
BR-JCFB C 35 \ Keyboard Concerto "London No. 5" in B-flat major
BR-JCFB C 36 \ Keyboard Concerto "London No. 6" in C major
BR-JCFB C 37 \ Harpsichord Concerto in E major - 1782 (Wf II/1)
BR-JCFB C 38 \ Keyboard Concerto (1766) (lost)
BR-JCFB C 39 \ Keyboard Concerto (1788) (lost)
BR-JCFB C 40 \ Harpsichord Concerto in F major - 1782 (Wf II/4)
BR-JCFB C 41 \ Harpsichord Concerto in D major - around 1780/85 (Wf II/2)
BR-JCFB C 42 \ Keyboard Concerto in A major (Wf II/3) (lost)
BR-JCFB C 43 \ "Concerto Grosso" in E-flat major - before September 1792 (Wf II/5) (1792)
BR-JCFB C 44 \ Concerto for Keyboard and Viola in E-flat major - around 1790 (wf S. 152)
BR-JCFB C 45 \ Concerto for Keyboard and Oboe in E-flat major (Wf III) (lost)
BR-JCFB C 46 \ Keyboard Concerto in C major - identity of composer is uncertain - before 1749

Vocal works
Liturgical Works
Oratorios
BR-JCFB D 1 \ Die Pillgrimme auf Golgatha - incorrectly attributed to CPE Bach H 862
BR-JCFB D 2a \ Original version Der Tod Jesu (Wf XIV/1) - (BWV 244/3, 244/62) - Performed April 13, 1770
BR-JCFB D 2b \ Later version Der Tod Jesu (Wf XIV/1) - erformed April 8, 1784
BR-JCFB D 3a \ Original version Die Auferstehung und Himmelfahrt Jesu (Wf XIV/10) - Performed April 19, 1772
BR-JCFB D 3b \ Later version Die Auferstehung und Himmelfahrt Jesu (Wf XIV/10) - around 1785 
BR-JCFB D 4 \ Die Hirten bey der Krippe Jesu (Wf XIV/9) (lost)
BR-JCFB D 5a \ Early version Die Kindheit Jesu (Wf XIV/2) - performed February 11, 1773
BR-JCFB D 5b \ Revised version Die Kindheit Jesu (Wf XIV/2) - around 1784/85
BR-JCFB D 6a \ Original version Die Auferweckung Lazarus (Wf XIV/3) - performed April 23, 1773
BR-JCFB D 6b \ Later version Die Auferweckung Lazarus (Wf XIV/3) - around 1785/90
BR-JCFB D 7 \ Der Fremdling auf Golgotha (Wf XIV/7) (lost)
Cantata
BR-JCFB D 8a \ Mosis Mutter und ihre Tochter (Wf XVII/3) (incomplete) - before February 1788 
BR-JCFB D 8b \ Keyboard reduction Mosis Mutter und ihre Tochter (Wf XVII/3) (incomplete) - before February 1788

Mass/ Mass set/ Magnificat 
BR-JCFB E 1a \ Miserere
BR-JCFB E 1b \ Miserere

Cantatas
BR-JCFB F 1 \ Pfingstkantate (Wf XIV/4) (lost)
BR-JCFB F 2 \ Sieh, Bückeburg, was Gott an Dir getan (lost)
BR-JCFB F 3 \ Himmelfahrts-Musik (Wf XIV/8)
BR-JCFB F 4 \ Michaels Sieg (Wf XIV/5)
BR-JCFB F 5 \ Nun, teures Land, der Herr hat dich erhört (lost)
BR-JCFB F 6 \ Singet dem Herrn ein neues Lied (Wf XIV/11) (lost)
BR-JCFB F 7 \ Gott wird deinen Fuß nicht gleiten lassen (Wf XIV/12)
BR-JCFB F Inc1 \ Funeral Music for Count Philipp Ernst (lost)
BR-JCFB F Inc2 \ Heut ist der Tag des Dankens, ihr Völker (lost)

Arias, cantatas and incidental music
BR-JCFB G 1 \ Luci amate ah non piangete (Wf XVIII/8)
BR-JCFB G 2 - 11 \ 10 Italian Arias (lost)
BR-JCFB G 12 - 26 \ 15 Italian Cantatas (lost)
BR-JCFB G 27 \ L'Inciampo (Wf XVIII/2)
BR-JCFB G 28 - 44 \ 18 Italian Cantatas (lost)
BR-JCFB G 45 \ Scenes for Il pastor fido (lost)
BR-JCFB G 46 \ Cassandra (Wf XVIII/1)
BR-JCFB G 47 \ Die Amerikanerin (Wf XVIII/3)
BR-JCFB G 48 \ Ino (Wf XVIII/4)
BR-JCFB G 49 \ Prokris und Cephalus (Wf XVIII/6)
BR-JCFB G 50 \ Pygmalion (Wf XVIII/5)
BR-JCFB G 51 \ Ariadne auf Naxos (lost)
BR-JCFB G 52 \ Brutus (Wf XVII/1) (lost)
BR-JCFB G 53 \ Philoktetes (Wf XVII/2) (lost)
BR-JCFB G Inc1 \ Stimmt an, greift rasch in eure Saiten (lost)
BR-JCFB G Inc2 \ Va crescendo il mio tormento

Songs
BR-JCFB H 1 \ Lied: Ein dunkler Feind (Wf XIX/1.1)
BR-JCFB H 2 \ Lied: Die Gespenster (Wf XIX/1.2)
BR-JCFB H 3 \ Lied: Die Zeit (Wf XIX:/1.3)
BR-JCFB H 4 \ Lied: Der Sieg über sich selbst (Wf XIX/1.4)
BR-JCFB H 5 \ Lied: Der Nachbarin Climene (Wf XIX/1.5)

Other works in Wohlfarth's catalogue
Wf V \ Sextet for piano, winds & strings in C major (see Johann Christian Bach WarB B 78)
Wf XV/1 \ Ich lieg und schlafe ganz mit Frieden
Wf XV/2 \ Wachet auf, ruft uns die Stimme, chorale motet on the hymn by Philipp Nicolai
Wf XV/3 \ Dem Erlöser
Wf XV/4 \ Unsere Auferstehung durch die Auferstehung Jesu
Wf XVI/1 \ 5 Geistliche Lieder
Wf XVI/2 \ 50 Geistliche Lieder
Wf XVIII/7 \ O, wir bringen gerne dir
Wf XVIIII/2 \ 24 Lieder
Wf XX/1 \ Keyboard Concerto in C minor
Wf XX/2 \ Keyboard Concerto in G major
Wf XX/4 \ Fugue for keyboard in C minor
Wf XXI/1 \ Arrangement of CPE Bach's "Weynachtslied"
Wf XXI/2 \ Arrangement of CPE Bach's "Dancklied"
Wf XXI/3 \ Arrangement of CPE Bach's "Der thätige Glaube"

Works not referenced in any catalogue
Cello Sonata in G major

References
Notes

Sources
 Ulrich Leisinger, "Johann Christoph Friedrich Bach," Grove Music Online
 Eugene Helm, "Johann Christoph Friedrich Bach" The New Grove Bach Family, Macmillan 1985

External links
 

1732 births
1795 deaths
People from Bückeburg
German Classical-period composers
German male classical composers
Johann Christoph Friedrich
Musicians from Leipzig
People from the Electorate of Saxony
Pupils of Johann Sebastian Bach
18th-century classical composers
18th-century German composers
18th-century German male musicians